Logan Creek is a stream in Wayne County in the U.S. state of Missouri. It is a tributary of the St. Francis River.

The source area for the stream lies just west of Mudlick Mountain and Sam A. Baker State Park. The stream flows south past Camp Lee and east crossing under Missouri Route 143 to join the St. Francis within the northern portion of Lake Wappapello.

Logan Creek has the name of the local Logan family.

See also
List of rivers of Missouri

References

Rivers of Wayne County, Missouri
Rivers of Missouri